Fulga is a commune in Prahova County, Muntenia, Romania. It is composed of two villages, Fulga de Jos and Fulga de Sus; the former is the administrative centre.

The river Bălana flows through the commune, forming a lake that separates the two component villages. The Bălana discharges into the Ghighiu at the eastern edge of Fulga.

The commune is crossed by county road DJ100C, which lead north to Baba Ana and Mizil (where it ends in national road DN1B) and south to Sălciile. Road DJ100B bifurcates from DJ100C in Fulga de Jos, leading west to Drăgănești, where it meets .

At the 2011 census, 93.74% of inhabitants were Romanians and 3.62% Roma.

Writer  (1916–1984) was born Laurențiu Ionescu in Fulga de Jos. He took his pen name after the commune; the local school now bears his name. Lawyer and politician Ana Birchall was born in 1973 in nearby Mizil, but grew up in Fulga de Jos, where she attended the local school.

Notes

Fulga
Localities in Muntenia